A zester (also, citrus zester or lemon zester) is a kitchen utensil for obtaining zest from lemons and other citrus fruit. To operate, the zester is pressed with moderate force against the fruit and drawn across its peel. The rims cut the zest from the pith underneath. The zest is cut into ribbons, one drawn through each hole.

Other tools are also sometimes called zesters because they too are able to separate the zest from a citrus fruit. For example, when Microplane discovered that its surform type wood rasps had become popular as food graters and zesters, it adapted the woodworking tools and marketed them as "zester / graters".

See also
 Grater
 Oroshigane
 Surform

References

External links

Food preparation utensils
Bartending equipment